Ignacewo may refer to the following places:
Ignacewo, Kuyavian-Pomeranian Voivodeship (north-central Poland)
Ignacewo, Masovian Voivodeship (east-central Poland)
Ignacewo, Podlaskie Voivodeship (north-east Poland)
Ignacewo, Koło County in Greater Poland Voivodeship (west-central Poland)
Ignacewo, Konin County in Greater Poland Voivodeship (west-central Poland)
Ignacewo, Kościan County in Greater Poland Voivodeship (west-central Poland)
Ignacewo, Wągrowiec County in Greater Poland Voivodeship (west-central Poland)